"In da Club" is a song by American rapper 50 Cent from his debut studio album Get Rich or Die Tryin' (2003). Written by 50 Cent alongside producers Dr. Dre and Mike Elizondo, the song, which uses an unconventional off-beat rhythm, was released in January 2003 as the album's lead single and peaked at number one on the US Billboard Hot 100, becoming 50 Cent's first number-one single.

"In da Club" received praise from critics; at the 46th Grammy Awards, it was nominated for Best Male Rap Solo Performance and Best Rap Song. The accompanying music video for "In da Club" won Best Rap Video and Best New Artist at the 2003 MTV Video Music Awards. In 2009, the song was listed at number 24 in Billboards Hot 100 Songs of the Decade. It was listed at number 13 in Rolling Stones "Best Songs of the Decade". In 2010, it was ranked 448th in Rolling Stones 500 Greatest Songs of All Time list. It was performed by 50 Cent in the Super Bowl LVI halftime show on February 13, 2022.

Background
After 50 Cent was discovered by fellow rapper Eminem in 2002, he flew to Los Angeles where he was introduced to record producer Dr. Dre. "In da Club" was the first of seven tracks he recorded in five days with Dr. Dre. 50 Cent described the studio sessions, saying: 

The production was originally given to the hip-hop group D12, but was passed on to 50 Cent because the group did not know how to approach the song. He recorded the track with only the drum beat present. Since much of the content on Get Rich or Die Tryin was "dark", he wanted to write material that was "the exact opposite". He called the song a "celebration of life. Every day it's relevant all over 'cause every day is someone's birthday."

Critical reception
"In da Club" received universal acclaim by music critics. AllMusic described it as "a tailor-made mass-market good-time single". The Source called the song a "guaranteed party starter" with its "blaring horns, funky organs, guitar riffs and sparse hand claps". The BBC also wrote that the song is "a spectacular party anthem" that "highlights 50 Cent's ability to twist his words effortlessly". Entertainment Weekly noted that 50 Cent "boasts unashamedly of his career objectives and newly flush bank account" with lyrics such as "I'm feelin' focus, man, my money on my mind/Got a mil out the deal and I'm still on the grind."

Rolling Stone wrote that the song sports "a spare yet irresistible synth hook augmented by a tongue-twisting refrain".The Guardian called the track "irresistible" due to its "sparse orchestral samples and snaking chorus", and Pitchfork Media said, "the bounce on 'In da Club' is straight-up irresistible, Dre at both his minimalist best and most deceptively infectious." Splendid magazine called the song an "insanely catchy" single with its "stanky, horn-addled thump". The track was listed at number ten on Blender magazine's "The 500 Greatest Songs Since You Were Born". In 2008, it was ranked at number 18 on VH1's "100 Greatest Hip Hop Songs".

Chart performance
{{blockquote|"Before my album Get Rich or Die Tryin came out, there was a big debate about what the first single should be. Jimmy Iovine thought it should be the one that Dr. Dre produced, 'If I Can't'. But Em wanted 'In Da Club'. In the end they were deadlocked, so they asked me and I told them, real quiet, 'In Da Club'." – 50 Cent}}
"In da Club" debuted on the US Billboard charts on issue date of January 11, 2003, and debuted at number 67. A couple of weeks later the song preceded to the top 10; after eight weeks, the song topped the charts, becoming his first number one, and stayed there for nine consecutive weeks on the Billboard Hot 100, blocking R. Kelly's "Ignition (Remix)" for five weeks. The song was later replaced by Sean Paul's "Get Busy" and remained in the top 10 for 17 weeks, and on the chart for 30 weeks."50 Cent - In da Club - Music Charts". aCharts.us. Retrieved July 5, 2007. The track also reached number one on the Top 40 Tracks, Hot R&B/Hip-Hop Songs, and Hot Rap Tracks charts. In March 2003, it broke a Billboard record as the "most listened-to" song in radio history within a week. Billboard also ranked it as the number one song for 2003. The Recording Industry Association of America certified the track Gold.

Nominated for Best Male Rap Solo Performance and Best Rap Song at the 2004 Grammy Awards, it lost to Eminem's "Lose Yourself".

Across Europe, it reached number one in Denmark, Germany, Ireland, Switzerland, Austria, Belgium, Finland, Greece, Norway, Sweden, and the Netherlands, and number three in the UK. In Australia, the single peaked at number one, was certified two times Platinum by the Australian Recording Industry Association, and on the 2003 year-end chart, it was listed at number five.

Music video
Philip Atwell directed the music video on December 10–11, 2002. Almost all the film footage was used in the video except for a scene where 50 Cent raps in a glass box. Set in a fictional hip hop boot camp known as the Shady/Aftermath Artist Development Center, the video begins with a black Hummer driving to the facility at an unknown location. Video clips from Eminem's single "Without Me" are seen playing in the entrance on flat-screen TVs. Eminem and Dr. Dre are seen looking down at the lab from a lab balcony with windows. 50 Cent is introduced by hanging upside down from a gym roof. Atwell commented, "I think I could have done better with it, but I really liked the way that it turned out". The video also contains a shooting range, which Atwell deemed appropriate because 50 Cent had been shot nine times. He said, "creatively, I felt like we were able to put guns in a video and have it play. And I like it when you are able to play within the standards and still give the artist something symbolic of what they are going for."

The video ends with the camera zooming out of the club to reveal a two-way mirror with Eminem and Dr. Dre in white lab uniforms, observing 50 Cent and taking notes. Atwell stated that "seeing 50 with Dre and Em having his back is as big a visual statement as it is a musical statement" and the shot was significant because it made clear the club was inside the center and not unrelated performance footage. On January 27, 2003, the video debuted on MTV's Total Request Live at number nine and stayed on the chart for fifty days. It also reached number one on the MuchMusic video charts. At the 2003 MTV Video Music Awards, the video was awarded Best Rap Video and Best New Artist and was nominated for Video of the Year, Best Male Video, and Viewer's Choice. Cameos include: Dr. Dre, Eminem, D12, Lloyd Banks, Tony Yayo, The Game (in his first cameo appearance), Bang' Em Smurf, Young Buck, Xzibit and DJ Whoo Kid.

As of January 21 2023, the music video has over 1.6 billion views on YouTube.

Lawsuit
In January 2006, 50 Cent was sued for copyright infringement by former 2 Live Crew manager Joseph Weinberger, who owns the rights to the rap group's catalog. He claimed that 50 Cent plagiarized the lines "it's your birthday" from the eponymous second track of former 2 Live Crew frontman Luther Campbell's 1994 album Freak for Life 6996 (also known simply as Freak for Life). The lawsuit was dismissed by U.S. District Judge Paul Huck, who ruled that the phrase was a "common, unoriginal and noncopyrightable element of the song".

Remixes
Many remixes for the song have been made by artists including Beyoncé, Mary J. Blige, P. Diddy, Lil Wayne, and many others who rapped their own verses over the song's instrumental.

"Sexy Lil Thug"

In 2003, American recording artist Beyoncé recorded a remix version of "In da Club" titled "Sexy Lil Thug". Her version sampled the original's instrumental and melody with the singer singing her own, newly added verses. In the song, she references Jimmy Choo shoes, Marilyn Monroe, Marc Jacobs, and Bailey Bank and Biddle. Makkada B. Selah of The Village Voice said, "Her version of 'In da Club' outed 50 Cent as a singing-ass rapper with lines like 'Don't wanna be your girl/I ain't lookin' for no love/So come give me a hug/You a sexy little thug. Joey Guerra of the Houston Chronicle coined Beyoncé's cover version as a "female spin" on the original. The song was officially released on Beyoncé's mixtape Speak My Mind.See [ AllMusic entry] for track listing. According to Guerra of the Houston Chronicle, the song was never an official single, likely because of permission issues. Beyoncé's version of the song charted for 7 weeks and peaked at number 67 on the US Billboard Hot R&B/Hip-Hop Songs chart. In 2013, Mike Wass of the website Idolator put "Sexy Lil Thug" at number six on his list of "Beyonce's 10 Best Unreleased And Rare Tracks". He described it as a "radio staple" in 2003, adding that it "remains something of a lost gem" and concluded "Queen Bey spit iconic lyrics like 'I’m that classy mami with the Marilyn Monroe body.

Sampling
"In da Club" has been sampled or interpolated in at least more than 90 songs, including "Mi Gna" by Super Sako and "Good Life" by Kanye West.

Appearances in other media
The song is featured in the films Soul Plane, Shark Tale, Beauty Shop, Dead Tone, and Detention, as well as the theatrical trailers for horror films Happy Death Day (2017) and Happy Death Day 2U (2019). It is also featured in the television shows The Wire, CSI: Crime Scene Investigation, Revenge, Lucifer, and The Fall. It was performed by 50 Cent in the Super Bowl LVI halftime show on February 13, 2022.

Track listing

 UK CD single "In da Club" (Single Version) (Clean) – 3:46
 "In da Club" (Single Version) (Explicit) – 3:45
 "Wanksta" – 3:41
 German CD single "In da Club" (Single Version) (Explicit) – 3:48
 "Wanksta" – 3:41
 German and Australian CD single'''
 "In da Club" (Single Version) (Explicit) – 3:48
 "Wanksta" – 3:41
 "In da Club" (Instrumental) – 6:18
 "In da Club" (Music Video) – 3:53
 "Wanksta" (Music Video) - 3:43

Personnel
Information taken from the liner notes of Get Rich or Die Tryin''.
 Producer: Dr. Dre
 Co-producer: Mike Elizondo
 Audio mixing: Dr. Dre
 Recording engineers: Mauricio "Veto" Iragorri, Sha Money XL
 Assistant engineers: James "Flea" McCrone, Francis Forde, Ruben Rivera
 Keyboards, guitars, bass: Mike Elizondo
 Percussion: DJ Quik

Charts

Weekly charts

Year-end charts

Decade-end charts

All-time charts

Certifications

Release history

See also
 List of best-selling singles in Australia
 List of Billboard Hot 100 number-one singles of 2003
 List of number-one R&B singles of 2003 (U.S.)

References

Songs about nightclubs
Songs about birthday parties
2003 singles
50 Cent songs
Billboard Hot 100 number-one singles
European Hot 100 Singles number-one singles
Number-one singles in Australia
Canadian Singles Chart number-one singles
Number-one singles in Denmark
Number-one singles in Germany
Irish Singles Chart number-one singles
Number-one singles in New Zealand
Number-one singles in Sweden
Number-one singles in Switzerland
Song recordings produced by Dr. Dre
Songs written by 50 Cent
Songs written by Mike Elizondo
Shady Records singles
Aftermath Entertainment singles
Interscope Records singles
Universal Music Group singles
Songs written by Dr. Dre
2002 songs
Songs involved in plagiarism controversies
Song recordings produced by Mike Elizondo